The Women's 470 was a sailing event on the Sailing at the 1988 Summer Olympics program in Pusan, South Korea. Seven races were scheduled. 42 sailors, on 21 boats, from 21 nations competed.

Results 

DNF = Did Not Finish, DSQ = Disqualified, PMS = Premature Start
Crossed out results did not count for the total result.
 = Male,  = Female

Daily standings

Notes

References 
 
 
 

470 Female
470 competitions
Oly
Sail
1988 in South Korean women's sport